onefinestay is a British hospitality company headquartered in London. It was founded in 2009.

onefinestay operates in London, New York, Paris, Los Angeles and Rome. The company provides a service to owners of distinctive and upmarket homeowners, by enabling them to let out their home to guests while the home is unoccupied.

As of April 2016, onefinestay has 2,600 private homes under its management.

In May 2016, onefinestay became a member of the British Hospitality Association.

Origins and history
The idea behind onefinestay was thought up by co-founder and former CEO Greg Marsh in 2009, following a trip to Pisa. A tip off from a local friend took him off the beaten track to Piazza delle Vettovaglie. He realised he’d never have experienced Pisa the same way if he hadn’t had this connection with someone who lived there. When Marsh returned to his flat in London he had a second realisation: it had been empty while he was abroad, and every time he travelled someone else could be experiencing London while staying in his home. Marsh’s home was the first to be listed on the onefinestay website.

Founded in 2009, onefinestay launched in London in May 2010 with just six homes. Over the course of 2011 the business grew tenfold, and soon expanded internationally, launching in New York in May 2012,  and in Los Angeles and Paris in September 2013 before launching in Rome in March 2016.

In April 2016, AccorHotels acquired onefinestay for at least $170 million (£117 million). The company is also committing to a $70 million investment in onefinestay (£50 million) over the next few years.

Four months following Accor's acquisition of onefinestay, Greg Marsh resigned in September 2016.

Funding
Marsh, along with Demetrios Zoppos and Tim Davey founded onefinestay in September 2009, and raised a small amount of seed funding from family and friends in 2009.

The website launched in May 2010 with just six homes listed. In February 2011, onefinestay raised $3.7 million Series A funding in a round led by Index Ventures. Other angel investors included Brent Hoberman, co-founder & CEO of Lastminute.com, Andy Phillipps, co-founder of ActiveHotels, and David Magliano, former Director of Marketing for London’s 2012 Olympic bid.

In June 2012, the company announced a $12.2 million Series B funding round, led by US venture capital firms.

In June 2015, the company announced a $40 million Series D funding round. The round included participation from investors including Intel Capital, Quadrant Capital Advisors, and leading global hospitality brand Hyatt Hotels, as well as a number of angel investors including Joss Kent, CEO of &Beyond and former global CEO of Abercrombie & Kent.

Business model

onefinestay homeowners
onefinestay allows homeowners to rent out their homes to vetted guests. onefinestay manages everything for the homeowner including all reservations. Its in-house housekeeping team prepares everything for the guests’ arrival. They will clean the house before the guests arrive and also after they leave. They will also put away any valuables the homeowner does not want on display.  Members keep onefinestay up to date on their home's availability using an online calendar.

Once a homeowner has been selected to join the service (the company turns down 9 out of 10 homes) onefinestay learns everything about the home, enabling them to answer any guest queries.

The homes listed range from one-bedroom apartments to town houses and boats.

Travel Trade and partners
onefinestay works with hospitality distribution partners and travel agents. The company also work with Centurion (the travel agent from American Express) and Signature.

Sherlock
Consisting of a physical device and a smartphone app, Sherlock enables secure keyless access to all types of homes including apartment buildings and walk-ups by using a mobile phone. The technology was initially developed by Daniel Townsend and continued by Eduardo Aguilar Peláez and team. The product now continues as an independent company called Klevio

Reception
The Guardian described onefinestay as “a fantastic option for staying in London” as it is “Better than house-sitting, in that you have no responsibilities, more interesting than a self-catered property or serviced apartment because the owner's possessions, their style, their touch and their personality remain.”  Country Life magazine also encouraged it readers to try onefinestay when they wrote “So next time you're heading into town for a meeting, dinner or trip to the theatre, think twice before booking the familiarity of your usual hotel, and live like a local instead”. This point was echoed by The Financial Times  who said "Glitterballs, private lifts and antique cocktails might be fun but how much more compelling is the chance to step into the shoes of a local?". These reviews have also been reflected by the European Startup Awards which named onefinestay as Best Travel and Hospitality Startup in 2011.

References 

Hotel and leisure companies based in London
Accor